Porcellio rufobrunneus is a species of woodlouse from the Porcellionidae family. The scientific name of this species was first published in 1923 by Omer-Cooper.

References

Porcellionidae